A selectable marker is a gene introduced into a cell, especially a bacterium or to cells in culture, that confers a trait suitable for artificial selection. They are a type of reporter gene used in laboratory microbiology, molecular biology, and genetic engineering to indicate the success of a transfection or other procedure meant to introduce foreign DNA into a cell. Selectable markers are often antibiotic resistance genes (An antibiotic resistance marker is a gene that produces a protein that provides cells expressing this protein with resistance to an antibiotic.). Bacteria that have been subjected to a procedure to introduce foreign DNA are grown on a medium containing an antibiotic, and those bacterial colonies that can grow have successfully taken up and expressed the introduced genetic material.
Normally the genes encoding resistance to antibiotics such as ampicillin, chloramphenicol, tetracycline or kanamycin, etc., are considered useful selectable markers for E. coli.

Modus operandi
The non-recombinants are separated from recombinants; i.e., a r-DNA is introduced in bacteria, some bacteria are successfully transformed some remain non-transformed. When grown on medium containing ampicillin, bacteria die due to lack of ampicillin resistance. The position is later noted on nitrocellulose paper and separated out to move them to nutrient medium for mass production of required product.
An alternative to a selectable marker is a screenable marker which can also be denoted as a reporter gene, which allows the researcher to distinguish between wanted and unwanted cells, e.g. between blue and white colonies. These wanted or unwanted cells are simply un-transformed cells that were unable to take up the gene during the experiment.

Positive and Negative
For molecular biology research different types of markers may be used based on the selection sought. These include:
Positive or selection markers are selectable markers that confer selective advantage to the host organism. An example would be antibiotic resistance, which allows the host organism to survive antibiotic selection.
Negative or counterselectable markers are selectable markers that eliminate or inhibit growth of the host organism upon selection. An example would be thymidine kinase, which makes the host sensitive to ganciclovir selection.
Positive and negative selectable markers can serve as both a positive and a negative marker by conferring an advantage to the host under one condition, but inhibits growth under a different condition. An example would be an enzyme that can complement an auxotrophy (positive selection) and be able to convert a chemical to a toxic compound (negative selection).

Common examples
Examples of selectable markers include:
Beta-lactamase which confers ampicillin resistance to bacterial hosts.
Neo gene from Tn5, which confers resistance to kanamycin in bacteria and geneticin in eukaryotic cells
Mutant FabI gene (mFabI) from E. coli genome, which confers triclosan resistance to the host.
URA3, an orotidine-5' phosphate decarboxylase from yeast is a positive and negative selectable marker. It is required for uracil biosynthesis and can complement ura3 mutants that are auxotrophic for uracil (positive selection). The enzyme URA3 also converts 5-fluoroorotic acid (5FOA) into the toxic compound 5-fluorouracil, so any cells carrying the URA3 gene will  be killed in the presence of 5FOA (negative selection).

Future developments
In the future alternative marker technologies will need to be used more often to, at the least, assuage concerns about their persistence into the final product. It is also possible that markers will be replaced entirely by future techniques which use removable markers, and others which do not use markers at all, instead relying on co-transformation, homologous recombination, and recombinase-mediated excision.

References

Genetics techniques
Molecular biology
Antimicrobial resistance